

See also 
 United States House of Representatives elections, 1792 and 1793
 List of United States representatives from Kentucky

References 

Kentucky
1792
United States House of Representatives